Sobre(tudo) was a 2001 album by Sam the Kid. The first single released for this album was called "Não Percebes". The album was re-released in 2005 in a special edition with tracks from Entre(tanto) included as bonus tracks. The re-release was called Sobre(tudo) (Special Edition).

Track listing

References 

2002 albums
Sam the Kid albums